Phalaris truncata is a species of plant in the family Poaceae (true grasses). They are associated with freshwater habitat.

Sources

References 

truncata
Flora of Malta